Kʼicheʼ (also known as   among its speakers),  or Quiché, is a Mayan language of Guatemala, spoken by the Kʼicheʼ people of the central highlands. With over a million speakers (some 7% of Guatemala's population), Kʼicheʼ is the second most widely-spoken language in the country, after Spanish. It is also the most widely-spoken indigenous American language in Mesoamerica.

The Central dialect is the most commonly used in media and education. Despite a low literacy rate, Kʼicheʼ is increasingly taught in schools and used on the radio. The most famous work in the Classical Kʼicheʼ language is the Popol Vuh (Popol Wuʼuj in modern spelling).  The second most important work is The Title of Totonicapán.

Dialects
Kaufman (1970) divides the Kʼicheʼ complex into the following five dialects, with the representative municipalities given as well (quoted in Par Sapón 2000:17): 
East
Joyabaj
Zacualpa
Cubulco
Rabinal
San Miguel Chicaj

West
Nahualá
Santa Clara La Laguna
Santa Lucía Utatlán
Aldea Argueta, Sololá
Cantel
Zunil
San José Chiquilajá, Quetzaltenango
Totonicapán
Momostenango

Central
Santa María Chiquimula
San Antonio Ilotenango
Santa Cruz del Quiché
Chichicastenango

North
Cunén

South
Samayac
Mazatenango

The Nahualá dialect of Kʼicheʼ shows some differences from other Kʼicheʼ dialects. It preserves an ancient Proto-Mayan distinction between five long vowels (aa, ee, ii, oo, uu) and five short vowels (a, e, i, o, u). It is for that conservative linguistic feature that Guatemalan and foreign linguists have actively sought to have the language called Kʼichee, rather than Kʼicheʼ or Quiché.

Phonology
Kʼicheʼ has a rather conservative phonology. It has not developed many of the innovations found in neighboring languages, such as retroflex consonants or tone.

Stress
Stress is not phonemic. It occurs on the final syllable and on every other syllable before the final in an iambic pattern.

For example, sibʼalaj "very" may be pronounced  and je na laʼ "thus" .

Vowels
Kʼicheʼ dialects differ in their vowel systems. Historically, Kʼicheʼ had a ten-vowel system: five short and five long. Some dialects (such as Nahualá and Totonicapán) retain the ten-vowel system. Others (such as Cantel) have reduced it to a six-vowel system with no length distinctions: short /a/ has become /ə/ in these dialects, and the other short vowels have merged with their long counterparts. Different conventions for spelling the vowels have been proposed, including by the Proyecto Lingüístico Francisco Marroquín, the Summer Institute of Linguistics, and the Academia de Lenguas Mayas de Guatemala.  This table shows the two vowel systems and several of the spelling systems that have been proposed:

Vowels typically undergo syncope in penultimate syllables, which allows for a wide array of complex onsets. Diphthongs are found in recent loanwords.

Consonants
Kʼicheʼ has pulmonic stops and affricates, /p/, /t/, /ts/, /tʃ/, /k/, and /q/, and glottalized counterparts /ɓ/, /tʼ/, /tsʼ/, /tʃʼ/, /kʼ/, and /qʼ/. The glottalized /ɓ/ is a weak implosive, and the other glottalized consonants are ejectives. The pulmonic stops and affricates are typically aspirated.

The fricative  is most common in the vicinity of the vowels /a(:)/ and /o(:)/.

Syllabic structure
Complex onsets are very common in Kʼicheʼ, partially because of the active process of penultimate syncope. Complex codas are rare except when the first member of the complex coda is a phonemic glottal stop, which is written with an apostrophe. The sonorants /m, n, l, r/ may be syllabic.

Orthography
Historically, different orthographies have been used to transcribe the Kʼicheʼ languages. The classical orthography of Father Ximénez, who wrote down the Popol Vuh, is based on Spanish orthography and has been replaced by a new standardized orthography, defined by the ALMG (Academia de Lenguas Mayas de Guatemala). The ethnohistorian and Mayanist Dennis Tedlock uses his own transliteration system, which is completely different from any of the established orthographies.

Morphology
Like other Mayan languages, Kʼicheʼ uses two sets of agreement markers, known to Mayanists as "Set A" and "Set B" markers, which can appear on both nouns and verbs. "Set A" markers are used on nouns to mark possessor agreement and on verbs to agree with the transitive subject (ergative case). "Set B" markers are used on verbs to agree with the transitive object or the intransitive subject (absolutive case).

Unlike the informal agreement markers, the formal agreement markers occur after the verb and verb particles. The formal agreement markers are used on nouns to mark possessor agreement and on both transitive and intransitive verbs for subject and object agreement.

Pronouns
Kʼicheʼ distinguishes six pronouns classified by person and number. Gender and case are not marked on pronouns, which are often omitted since subject and object agreement are obligatorily marked on the verb.

Verbs
Kʼicheʼ verbs are morphologically complex and can take numerous prefixes and suffixes, which serve both inflectional and derivational purposes. Agreement follows an ergative/absolutive pattern: subjects of transitive verbs are indexed with Set A markers, while intransitive subjects and transitive objects are indexed with Set B markers. Aspect and mood are also indicated via verbal morphology, as is movement: the prefix ul- in the movement slot indicates movement towards the speaker, and the prefix e- (or bʼe- in some varieties) indicates movement away from the speaker.

The table below shows the inflectional template of a Kʼicheʼ verb.

The last morpheme on a verb, the so-called "status suffix," is a portmanteau morpheme, the form of which is determined by a set of rules that includes factors such as:
 whether the verb is transitive or intransitive
 whether the verb's mood is indicative or imperative
 whether or not the verb contains a movement marker
 whether or not the verb falls at the end of an intonational phrase

Voice and derivation 
The examples above involve verbs with simple stems. Verb stems may also be morphologically complex.  Complex stems may involve voice suffixes:

 Causative (CA): -isa (-kam- "die", -kam-isa- "kill (someone)")
 Passive (PV): -x (-kuna- "cure (someone)", -kuna-x- "be cured")
 Completive passive (CP): -taj (-kuna- "cure (someone)", -kuna-taj- "be completely cured; recover")
 Absolutive Antipassive (AA): -n, -on or -un (-mes- "sweep (something) clean", -mes-on- "sweep up")
 Focus Antipassive (FA): -n, -ow or -uw (-mes- "sweep (something) clean", -mes-ow- "sweep up")

Also, derivational suffixes may be included, many of which form verb stems from other parts of speech. For instance, the versive suffix -ir or -ar forms verb stems from adjectives: utz "good", -utz-ir- "get good"; nim "big", -nim-ar- "get big."  Multiple suffixes can appear within a single stem: -nim-ar- "get big", -nim-ar-isa- "enlarge (something)", -nim-ar-isa-x- "be enlarged."

Syntax
As with all other Mayan languages, Kʼicheʼ has an ergative pattern of verb agreement and often uses verb-object-subject (VOS) word order. Most modern speakers use SOV, SVO, and VSO word orders interchangeably. Language purists have tried to preserve the traditional verb-initial word order, but influence from Spanish (an SVO language) promotes a subject-initial order.

Focus Antipassive
The Focus Antipassive (FA) is used in K'iche' when the ergative subject of a transitive verb is in focus. This occurs in several contexts:

Agent focus (Mondloch 1981:215)

Agent question (Mondloch 1981:227)

Agent relative (Mondloch 1981:229)

This constraint only applies to the subjects of transitive verbs. Subjects of intransitive verbs can be extracted without adding the Focus Antipassive:

Mondloch (1981) provides an extensive discussion of the exceptions to the constraint on the extraction of ergative subjects. Further discussions of the Focus Antipassive in K’iche’ appear in Larsen (1987), Pye (1989) and Hale (1998).

Verb Complementation
K'iche' has finite and non-finite types of verb complement clauses.

Finite complement clause

Non-finite complement clauses

K'iche' uses nominalized verbs in non-finite complement clauses. Nominalized verbs are nouns and are used as such, e.g. after a preposition. Mondloch claims that K’iche’ does not have a way to nominalize transitive verbs directly. Transitive verbs must be converted to intransitive verbs by a passive or antipassive change in voice before they can be nominalized (1981:101).

 Nominalized intransitive verb complement (Mondloch 1981:90)

 Nominalized transitive verb complement (Mondloch 1981:191)

AA:Absolutive Antipassive
ABS:Absolutive Agreement
ERG:Ergative Agreement
PA:Passive
CA:Causative
CP:Completive Passive
FA:Focus Antipassive
INC:Incompletive Aspect
COM:Completive Aspect
NOM:Nominalization
ST:Status:K'iche' language#Verb status

Babytalk
Contrary to how many other languages use high pitch in child directed speech (babytalk), Kʼicheʼ babytalk has been shown not to use high pitch. Mayans, in fact, lower their pitch slightly when they speak to children since in Quiche Mayan culture, high pitch is very often used to address persons of high status.

Child Language
There is extensive documentation of child language acquisition for K’iche’. Overviews of language development in K’iche’ can be found in Pye (1992, 2017) and Pye and Rekart (1990). Child language data for K’iche’ have overturned most theories of language development and demonstrate the need for more extensive documentation of indigenous languages.

K’iche’ children produce a higher proportion of nouns than children acquiring other Mayan languages. Twenty-six percent of words produced by a two-year-old K’iche’ child were common nouns, while 7 percent were intransitive verbs and 6 percent were transitive verbs (Pye, Pfeiler and Mateo Pedro 2017). Fifteen percent of two-year-old children’s words have the form consonant vowel (CV), while two thirds of their words have the form CVC (Pye 1991).

Two-year-old K’iche’ children produce the consonants /m, n, p, t, ch, k, ʔ, j, l, and w/. They produce the bilabial implosive consonant as /b/. Children produce /k/ and /ʔ/ in place of /q/, /x/ in place of /s/, /l/ in place of /r/, and /ch/ in place of /tz/. K’iche’ children begin producing ejective consonants after they are three years old (Pye, Ingram and List 1987). The early production of /ch/ and /l/ in K’iche’, as well as the late production of /s/, overturns predictions that all children have similar phonologies due to articulatory development.

The acquisition of morphology in K’iche’ is heavily influenced by prosody (Pye 1980, 1983). Primary stress is word-final in K’iche’ and two-year-old children favor the production of word-final syllables with the form CVC. Children do not consistently produce inflectional prefixes on nouns and verbs before they are four years old, although they consistently produce the status suffixes on verbs by the time they are two years old. Their production of the status suffixes is evidence that two-year-old K’iche’ children understand the complex grammatical constraints on the use of status suffixes. They distinguish between the use of the suffixes in phrase-final and phrase-medial positions, the forms of status suffixes for intransitive, root transitive and derived transitive verbs, as well as the distinction between the suffixes for indicative and imperative verbs.

The children’s utterances with the existential verb  ("it exists") illustrate their status suffix expertise. The existential verb in K’iche’ belongs to the positional verb class. In phrase-final contexts, it has the root , the positional suffix -l, and the intransitive status suffix -ik. Only the root is used in phrase-medial contexts, e.g.  ("it doesn't exist"). For the most part, K’iche’ children produce the phrase-medial and phrase-final forms of the existential verb in their appropriate contexts. They frequently produce the final, stressed syllable /lik/ of the existential in phrase-final contexts, omitting the root entirely (Pye 1991). The children’s facility in producing the status suffixes on verbs overturns predictions that children begin by producing lexical roots before they add inflectional morphemes. The alternation between the phrase-medial and phrase-final productions demonstrates the children’s use of distinct verb forms in their appropriate contexts rather than generalizing a rote verb form. 

The children’s production of verb status suffixes also demonstrates their early recognition of the distinction between intransitive and transitive verbs in K’iche’. This distinction is a core feature of K’iche’ grammar, and underpins the ergative morphology on the verbs and nouns. The semantic diversity of the verbs and positionals overturns the hypothesis that children use prototypical activity scenes as a basis for constructing grammatical categories. The children’s grammatical acumen is best seen in their use of the ergative and absolutive agreement prefixes on verbs. Although three-year-old K’iche’ speakers produce the ergative and absolutive person markers on verbs in 50 percent or less of their obligatory contexts, they do not use the ergative markers on intransitive verbs or vice versa (Pye 1990, 1991). The children’s production of ergative morphology overturns proposals that children begin language acquisition with a single grammatical category of subject.

K’iche’ adults rarely produce utterances with both subject and object using the unmarked verb object subject (VOS) word order. The children likewise frequently omit one or both verb arguments. Two-year-old children omit the subject in 90 percent of utterances with transitive verbs, in 84 percent of utterances with intransitive verbs, and omit the object in 60 percent of utterances with transitive verbs. The children most frequently produced VSO utterances in the few instances in which they produced overt subjects and objects (Pye 1991, 2017).

Although the majority of the children’s utterances have verbs in the active voice, they begin producing verbs in the other voices by the time they are two-years-old. The children produce a variety of verbs in a variety of voices, which is evidence of their productive use of voice alternation as a grammatical resource. They use verbs in the active, passive and antipassive voices. Three and four-year-old children responded appropriately in a pointing task that tested their comprehension of Focus Antipassive questions (Pye 1991; Pye and Quixtan Poz 1988).

The acquisition data for K’iche’ and other Mayan languages have profound implications for language acquisition theory (Pye, Pfeiler and Mateo Pedro 2017). Children demonstrate an early proficiency with verb inflection in languages with a rich morphology and where the language’s prosodic structure highlights the morphology. The K’iche’ children’s use of status suffixes shows that two-year-olds are capable of using semantically abstract affixes appropriately. This morphology accounts for the language-specific look of the children’s early utterances and guides its development in later stages.

Loanwords in other languages

Notes

References

Edmonson, Munro S. 1965. Quiche-English Dictionary. Middle American Research Institute, Tulane University, publ. no. 30. 
García-Hernández, Abraham; Yac Sam, Santiago and Pontius, David Henne. 1980. Diccionario Quiché-Español. Instituto Linguistico de Verano, Guatemala 
Grimes, Larry. 1972. The Phonological History of the Quichean Languages. Mayan Languages Collection of Larry Grimes. The Archive of the Indigenous Languages of Latin America: www.ailla.utexas.org. Media: text. Access: public. Resource: QUC001R004.
Hale, Ken. (1998). El antipassivo de enfoque del k'ichee’ y el inverso del Chukchi: Un estudio de la concordancia excéntrica. În Z. Estrada Fernandez et al. (Eds.), IV Encuentro Internacional de Lingüística en el Noroeste. Tomo I, Lenguas Indígenas, volumen I. Editorial Unison, Universidad de Sonora. 
Kaufman, Terrence. 1970. Proyecto de alfabetos y ortografías para escribir las lenguas mayances. Antigua: Editorial José de Pineda Ibarra.
Larsen, Thomas W. 1987. The syntactic status of ergativity in Quiche. Lingua 71: 33-59.

Mondloch, James L. 1978. Basic Quiche Grammar. Institute for Mesoamerican Studies, University at Albany, The State University of New York, publ. no. 2.

Par Sapón, María Beatriz. 2000. Variación dialectal en kʼicheeʼ . Guatemala City: Cholsamaj.
Par Sapón, María Beatriz and Can Pixabaj, Telma Angelina. 2000. Ujunamaxiik ri Kʼicheeʼ Chʼabʼal, Variación Dialectal en Kʼicheeʼ . Proyecto de Investigación Lingüística de Oxlajuuj Keej Mayaʼ Ajtzʼiibʼ. Guatemala City: (OKMA)/Editorial Cholsamaj. .

Pye, Clifton, Ingram, David and List, Helen. (1987). A comparison of initial consonant acquisition in English and Quiché. In Keith Nelson and Anne van Kleeck (Eds.), Children's Language, Vol. 6, pp. 175-190. Erlbaum.
Pye, Clifton and Quixtan Poz, Pedro. (1988). Precocious passives (and antipassives) in Quiché Mayan. Papers and Reports on Child Language Development 27.71-80. Stanford. 

Pye, Clifton and Rekart, Deborah. (1990). La adquisición del K'iche'. In Nora C. England and Stephen R. Elliott (Eds.), Lecturas sobre la Lingüistica Maya, pp. 115-126. Centro de Investigaciones Regionales de Mesoamérica.

Pye, Clifton. (1991). The acquisition of K’iche’ (Maya). In Dan Isaac Slobin (Ed.), The Crosslinguistic Study of Language Acquisition, Vol. 3, pp. 221-308. Erlbaum.
Pye, Clifton. (2001). The acquisition of finiteness in K’iche’ Maya. BUCLD 25: Proceedings of the 25th annual Boston University Conference on Language Development, pp. 645-656. Cascadilla Press.

Pye, Clifton, Pfeiler, Barbara and Mateo Pedro, Pedro. 2017. Mayan language acquisition. In Judith Aissen, Nora C. England and Roberto Zavala Maldonado (Eds.), The Mayan Languages, pp. 19-42. Routledge.
Pye, Clifton and Pfeiler, Barbara. (2019). The acquisition of directionals in two Mayan languages. Front. Psychol. 10:2442.

 
Sam Colop. 1999. Popol Wuj — Versión Poética Kʼicheʼ. PEMBI/GTZ/Cholsamaj. (In the Quiché Maya language).
 Tedlock, Dennis. 1996. Popol Vuh: The Definitive Edition of the Mayan Book of the Dawn of Life and the Glories of Gods and Kings. Touchstone Books. .

External links
 A Kʼicheʼ–English Dictionary
A reversal of Christenson's Kʼicheʼ–English Dictionary into an English–Kʼicheʼ Dictionary
Decree 19-2003 of Guatemala
Brief Kʼicheʼ tutorial in English and Spanish
Quiché Some basics of Quiché on Spanish-language Wikibooks (in Spanish)
Arte de Lengua Kiché, Anleo, Bartholomé de, ca. 1630–1694 
Zaccicoxol, ó Baile de Cortés en kiché y castellano, Berendt, C. Hermann
Calendario de los indios de Guatemala, 1722, Kiché, Berendt, C. Hermann
Einführung in das kolonialzeitliche Kʼicheʼ (Quiché) by Michael Dürr – an introduction to Classical Kʼicheʼ, in German
Morphologie, Syntax und Textstrukturen des Maya-Quiche des Popol Vuh by Michael Dürr – a description of the grammar of the Classical Kʼicheʼ of Popol Vuh, in German
Mayan Languages Collection of Larry Grimes, containing audio recordings of word lists in Kʼicheʼ, from Archive of the Indigenous Languages of Latin America.

K'iche'
Mayan languages
Agglutinative languages
Indigenous languages of Central America
Languages of Guatemala
Baja Verapaz Department
Quetzaltenango Department
Quiché Department
Sololá Department
Suchitepéquez Department
Totonicapán Department
Mesoamerican languages